Angela Clarke may refer to:

Angela Clarke (American actress) (1909–2010), stage, television and film performer
Angela Clarke (English actress) (born 1969), television performer and screenwriter
Angela Clarke, Canadian curator at Italian Cultural Centre Vancouver, active since 1990s
Angela Clarke (volleyball) (born 1975), Australian Olympian in 2000
Angela Clarke (author) (born 1980 / 1981), English columnist, playwright and novelist

See also
Angela Clark, Zimbabwean competitor in Diving at the 1994 Commonwealth Games as well as 1998